Drishtikone (English: Perspective) is a 2018 Bengali thriller film written and directed by Kaushik Ganguly, starring Prosenjit Chatterjee, and Rituparna Sengupta in lead roles. Despite receiving mixed reviews from critics and audience alike, the film turned out to be a "superhit" at the box office.

Plot

Jion Mitra (Prosenjit Chatterjee) leads a simple life with his wife Rumki (Churni Ganguly) until he gets confronted with a case involving the murder of Srimoti's (Rituparna Sengupta) husband Polash (Kaushik Sen) who was accidentally killed by his elder brother Pritom (Kaushik Ganguly) and for that he feels guilty but he is innocent which was later discovered by Jion's tactics and intellect. The story is tailored by the very experienced writer Kaushik Ganguly, it is a matter of maturity and skill to be framed as Jion and Srimoti as well as Rumki who are the main cast in this movie. They all are married, professional, experienced and larger than life characters. Jion got the eye donated by Polash Sen, this issue worked in Srimoti's mind so, she wanted to have a relation with Jion because she madly loved her husband. She found some events to be connected with Jion-Rumki's family. Also Jion was caring about her as his client, but Srimoti took permission to be connected from them as a family friend. The director stared thriller game from this phase that Pritom Sen had a hidden relation with his personal nurse played by Dolon Roy, that opened up to Jion's junior staff Ovik played by Soham Majumdar. The story got rise with a new pace at this. The Mitra family with Ovik and Srimoti went for a tour to Puri-Jagannath where Rumki saw Srimoti getting closer to Jion. Her doubt was not wrong, Srimoti had no control over her emotion and opened up romantically to Jion, he was not interested to break his peaceful life with Rumki, but became a support to Sri also. We saw a loving space was growing in Jion's mind. Rumki stayed in a difference from him, tried to take time on it over. Now after coming back Rumki and Jion got a hot discussion about Srimoti, like a typical house wife she wanted to protect her husband for her, also for her kids and family status, but Jion did not admit anything. Rumki met Sri in her office to settle the matter. Jion's another face came strongly in front of the audience, on his case: to solve it he took help from Police IG. They planned to confront Pritom Sen, because Jion was confirmed about Polash was murdered by a group of human Organ Raketting criminals, Jion wanted to know Pritom's involvement in it. The climax was surprising!it came out that Polash was involved with the Criminals, in an exciting situation the brothers had hot conflict and Polash had a hit from Pritom and got dead on spot. Then the other helping staff advised them to ride on the car to leave the town urgently. On the way to Bolpur, there the driver keep the car on the busy highway and vanished. The upcoming truck push heavily the car and it got an accidental make-up and Pritom got rid from the problem by taking a false paralysed lifestyle. The story has an interesting mood after this. A sudden electric cut-out happened and Pritom got over the rooftop attempted suicide. It just break everything in Srimoti's life. After all excitement ended, then she requests to Jion to go back his family life and promised not to meet again. Sri also opened the truth that, she loved him for the eye-sight of Polash was with Jion, not him personally. This fact break down Jion deeply. He came back home, Rumki was waiting for him on the balcony. A new and happy journey started again.

Cast
 Prasenjit Chatterjee as Jion Mitra 
 Rituparna Sengupta as Srimoti Sen
 Kaushik Ganguly as Pritam Sen
 Churni Ganguly as Rumki Mitra
 Kaushik Sen as Palash Sen
 Dolon Roy as Nurse
 Soham Majumdar as Avik
 Bharat Kaul as DCP Rajib Routh

Soundtrack

References

External links
 

Films directed by Kaushik Ganguly
2018 films
Bengali-language Indian films
2010s Bengali-language films
Films scored by Anupam Roy